Sahand Sahebdivani (born 18 May 1980 in Tehran) is an Iranian–Dutch storyteller, musician and founder of cultural center the Mezrab.

Biography
After the Iranian Revolution, at the age of three Sahebdivani fled with his parents from Iran to the Netherlands in 1983. They were originally headed for Canada, but missed their transfer in Amsterdam, which is why the family ended up in the Netherlands. In his twenties he by chance got the opportunity to become storyteller at the Tropenmuseum, when another Iranian storyteller noticed his hat in the tram. He became motivated to continue his parents' Iranian tradition of storytelling and music making, which is why he founded the Mezrab in 2004. This started as a monthly gathering in a small teahouse, but within ten years grew into an established cultural center with a multidisciplinary programme of five days per week.

As his cultural center grew, so did his career as an artist. Together with various storytellers, actors and musicians he performs at theatres and festivals across the Netherlands and internationally. In 2014 he was chosen as the Netherlands' Best Storyteller of the Year. In 2017 together with storyteller Raphael Rodan he won the Amsterdam Fringe Gold Award for their play My Father Held a Gun. In 2020 Sahebdivani's cultural center won the Amsterdamprijs voor de Kunst (Amsterdam Prize for the Arts) for Best Achievements.

Theatre
Sahebdivani played in among others the following plays and shows:

 2012–2015: Kingdom of Fire and Clay
 2016–2017: My Father Held a Gun
 2018: In het Hol van de Leeuw
 2019: De Ontheemden
 2020: Sons of Abraham
 2022: Stories of King Monkey
 2022: Het verre woord
 2023: Nachtreis

See also 

 Mezrab, the cultural center founded by Sahebdivani
 Storytelling
 Iranians in the Netherlands

External links 

 Official website
 Website of cultural centre the Mezrab

References 

Dutch artists
Dutch musicians
Dutch actors
Iranian actors
Iranian artists

1980 births
Living people
People from Tehran
Exiles of the Iranian Revolution
Iranian emigrants to the Netherlands